This Song may refer to:

 "This Song", a song by George Harrison from Thirty Three & ⅓
 "This Song", a song by Badly Drawn Boy from The Hour of Bewilderbeast
 "This Song", a song by Ballin' Jack from Special Pride
 "This Song", a song by Cassius from 15 Again
 "This Song", a song by Daniel Johnston from Retired Boxer
 "This Song", a song by Evelyn "Champagne" King from The Girl Next Door
 "This Song", a song by Grizzly Bear from Horn of Plenty
 "This Song", a song by Marty Robbins from It's a Sin
 "This Song", a song by McFly from Above the Noise
 "This Song", a song by Meat Puppets from Rise to Your Knees
 "This Song", a song by Polyrock from Polyrock
 "This Song", a song by Quarashi from Guerilla Disco
 "This Song", a song by RAC from Ego
 "This Song", a song by Ron Sexsmith from Blue Boy
 "This Song", a song by The Stranglers from Dark Matters
 "This Song", a song by T-Square / The Square from Midnight Lover
 "This Song", a song by Those Darn Accordions from Squeeze Machine
 "This Song (Has Probably Been Played Before)", a song by Spring Heeled Jack from Static World View
 "This Song: For the True and Passionate Lovers of Music", a song by Shai Hulud from That Within Blood Ill-Tempered

See also
 Song (disambiguation)